Ayten Amin (Arabic: آيتن أمين) is an Egyptian film director. She began her career making documentary films during the Egyptian Revolution of 2011. She is best known for Tahrir 2011: The Good, the Bad, and the Politician and Villa 69.

Early life
Ayten Amin was born in Alexandria, Egypt. She studied Film Criticism in 2001. Her first films were shorts about belly dancing and Egyptian actress Madiha Kamel in 2005. At American University in Cairo, she produced Her Man, which was screened in 10 international film festivals. She began working as an Assistant Director in 2008. Her breakout was in 2011 with SPRING 89 which was shown at Cannes Film Festival.

Film career
Ayten Amin's most recognized film is Tahrir 2011: The Good, the Bad, and the Politician. She was in Cairo during the January 25th protests and the Egyptian Revolution, and the interest of the protests prompted her filming them and co-directing Tahrir 2011, with her part of the contribution being The Bad. This film catapulted her film career out of obscurity, allowing her to create Villa 69 and gaining notable roles in writing and producing. Her film Souad was included in The Guardian's 50 Best Films of 2021 in the UK.

Reception
Amin is a young filmmaker and has been critiqued in the creation of Villa 69 for taking on too difficult of a project than she could bring to completion. Her contribution to Tahrir 2011 has been critiqued as being unique but nothing extraordinary in that the proponents of the Mubarak regime she interviewed fell in with their expected role and were predictable.

References

1978 births
Living people
Egyptian film directors
Egyptian women film directors
Egyptian documentary filmmakers
Women documentary filmmakers